Harry A. Cole (January 1, 1921 – February 14, 1999) was an American lawyer, jurist and politician. He was a member of the Maryland State Senate from Baltimore, Maryland. He was the first African-American ever elected to the Maryland Senate and the first African-American to serve on the Maryland Court of Appeals.

Background
Born in Washington, D.C.,  Cole was one of five children.  His father died while he was an infant and his mother moved the family back to Baltimore where she had grown up. Cole attended Baltimore public schools and graduated from Douglass High School, he then attended and graduated as class valedictorian from Morgan State College with an A.B. in 1943. Immediately after college, Cole joined the U.S. Army where he was commissioned as a 1st Lieutenant in the Quartermaster Corps.  He received an honorable discharge in 1946. Cole resumed his education and went on to the University of Maryland Law School where he earned an LL.B. in 1949.  He was admitted to the Maryland Bar in 1949.

Judicial career
Associate Judge, Municipal Court of Baltimore City, 1967.  Associate Judge, Supreme Bench of Baltimore City (now Circuit Court), 1967–77.  Associate Judge, Maryland Court of Appeals, 1977–91.

Personal life
Cole married the former Doris Freeland in 1958; three daughters:  Susan, Harriette and Stephanie.  He died of pneumonia at Church Home, Baltimore, Maryland on February 14, 1999.

See also
List of African-American jurists
List of first minority male lawyers and judges in Maryland

References

1921 births
1999 deaths
African-American judges
Morgan State University alumni
University of Maryland Francis King Carey School of Law alumni
Republican Party Maryland state senators
Lawyers from Baltimore
Judges of the Maryland Court of Appeals
United States Army officers
United States Army personnel of World War II
20th-century American lawyers
20th-century American judges
Deaths from pneumonia in Maryland
20th-century American politicians
20th-century African-American politicians
African-American men in politics
Politicians from Baltimore
African-American United States Army personnel